Pol Mikel Lirola Kosok (born 13 August 1997) is a Spanish professional footballer who plays as right-back for La Liga club Elche, on loan from Ligue 1 club Marseille.

Club career

Espanyol
Born in Mollet del Vallès, Barcelona, Catalonia, Lirola started his career at RCD Espanyol youth system, making his debut with B team in the Spanish third division in 2014. Lirola was sent on loan to Italian side Juventus in January 2015, where he joined the club's youth side.

Juventus
During the summer session of the transfer market later that year, Juventus bought Lirola outright. On 28 July 2016, he moved to Sassuolo on a two-year loan.

Lirola made his official professional debut in the play-off round of the UEFA Europa League, assisting Domenico Berardi's goal in a 1–1 away draw against Red Star Belgrade, which enabled the club to qualify for the group stage of the competition for the first time in their history. In the same competition, he scored the opening goal, the first of his career, in a 3–0 home win over Athletic Bilbao on 15 September, in the club's opening group match; this was the club's historic first ever goal in official European competitions.

Sassuolo
On 31 January 2018, Sassuolo signed Lirola outright, for €7 million fee.

Fiorentina
On 1 August 2019, Lirola joined Serie A side Fiorentina on loan with an obligation to buy.

Marseille 
On 12 January 2021, Lirola joined French side Marseille, on a loan until the end of the season.

Loan to Elche
On 12 August 2022, Lirola moved to La Liga club Elche on loan with an option to buy.

International career
Lirola has represented the Spain at the under-17 level in 2013. On 28 December 2016, he made his debut for the Catalonia national football team, starting in a 3–3 draw against Tunisia (2–4 penalty loss).

Personal life
Lirola is of German descent through his mother. He holds a German passport, and speaks the language fluently.

Career statistics

Club

Honours
Spain U21
UEFA European Under-21 Championship: 2019

References

External links

1997 births
Living people
People from Vallès Oriental
Sportspeople from the Province of Barcelona
Spanish footballers
Footballers from Catalonia
Association football fullbacks
Segunda División B players
Serie A players
Ligue 1 players
La Liga players
RCD Espanyol B footballers
Juventus F.C. players
U.S. Sassuolo Calcio players
ACF Fiorentina players
Olympique de Marseille players
Elche CF players
Expatriate footballers in Italy
Expatriate footballers in France
Spanish expatriate sportspeople in Italy
Spanish expatriate sportspeople in France
Spain youth international footballers
Spain under-21 international footballers
Catalonia international footballers
Spanish people of German descent